Samuel Nicholson (1743–1811) was an officer in the Continental Navy and the United States Navy.

Samuel Nicholson may also refer to:

 Samuel Nicholson (merchant) (1738–1827), English wholesale haberdasher and banker
 Samuel Caldwell Nicholson (died 1891), British trade unionist
 Samuel D. Nicholson (1859–1923), United States Senator from Colorado
 Sam Nicholson (born 1995), Scottish footballer

See also
 Nicholson (name)